Say Yeah may refer to:

"Say Yeah" (Kiss song), 2009
"Say Yeah" (The Urge song), 2011
"Say Yeah" (Wiz Khalifa song), 2008
"Say Yeah" (Yves Larock song), 2008
"Say Yeah", a 1984 song by The Limit
"Say Yeah!: Motto Miracle Night", a song by Morning Musume from the album Best! Morning Musume 1

See also
"I Say Yeah!", by Neosite artists
"We Say Yeah", by Cliff Richard & the Shadows